Erie County is a county in the Commonwealth of Pennsylvania. It is the northernmost county in Pennsylvania. As of the 2020 census, the population was 270,876. Its county seat is Erie. The county was created in 1800 and later organized in 1803.

Erie County comprises the Erie, PA Metropolitan Statistical Area.

History
Erie County was established on March 12, 1800, from part of Allegheny County, which absorbed the lands of the disputed Erie Triangle in 1792. Prior to 1792, the region was claimed by both New York and Pennsylvania and so no county demarcations were made until the federal government intervened.

Since Erie County and its newly established neighboring Counties of Crawford, Mercer, Venango, and Warren were initially unable to sustain themselves, a five-county administrative organization was established at Crawford County's Meadville to temporarily manage government affairs in the region. Erie first elected its own county officials in 1803. Unfortunately, on March 23, 1823, the Erie County Courthouse burned and all county records to that point were destroyed.

The county was originally settled by immigrants of "Yankee" stock (immigrants from New England and the western part of New York descended from the English Puritans whose ancestors settled New England in the colonial era). Erie County resembled Upstate New York more than it did Pennsylvania with its population primarily consisting of settlers from Connecticut, Rhode Island and Maine.  Roads were laid out, post routes established, public buildings erected and people were invited to move there. The original settlers were entirely of New England origins or were Yankees from upstate New York whose families had moved to that place from New England only one generation earlier, in the aftermath of the Revolutionary War.  This resulted in Erie County being culturally very contiguous with early New England culture.

Erie County was part of the Underground Railroad giving slaves the ability to gain freedom through Lake Erie into Canada, East through New York State, or to stay in Erie with the help of abolitionists and the free black community. Today, the "Journey to Freedom" educational program provides an interactive program on the Underground Railroad experience.

Geography
It is the largest county in Pennsylvania by total area. With the exception of a high ridge several miles from the lake, running nearly parallel with its shore, the terrain is generally rolling and well watered. It is the only county in the state that occupies a significant amount of land north of the 42nd parallel.

There are two cities in Erie County: the city of Erie and the city of Corry. Other notable population centers include Millcreek, Harborcreek and Fairview townships, and the boroughs of Edinboro, North East, Girard, Waterford and Union City. Erie County is bordered on the northeast by Chautauqua County, New York, on the east by Warren County, on the south by Crawford County, and on the west by Ashtabula County, Ohio. Directly north of the county is Lake Erie. This position on the water makes Erie County the only county in Pennsylvania to share a border with Canada, which is located on the far shore of the lake.

The county has a warm-summer humid continental climate (Dfb). Average monthly temperatures in downtown Erie range from 26.4 °F in January to 70.8 °F in July, while in Corry they range from 23.8 °F in January to 68.2 °F in July.

Adjacent counties
Haldimand County, Ontario (north)
Norfolk County, Ontario (northwest)
Chautauqua County, New York (northeast)
Warren County (southeast)
Crawford County (south)
Ashtabula County, Ohio (southwest)

Major highways

Demographics

According to the 2010 census, there were 280,566 people, 110,413 households, and 70,196 families residing in the county. The racial makeup of the county was 88.2 percent White, 7.2 percent Black or African American, 0.2 percent Native American, 1.1 percent Asian, 0.03 percent Pacific Islander, 1.2 percent from other races, and 2.1 percent from two or more races. A further 3.4 percent of the population were Hispanic or Latino of any race. 24.4% were of German, 12.5% Polish, 12.3% Italian, 10.1% Irish, 6.5% English and 6.4% American ancestry.

Of the total number of household, 27.2 percent had children under the age of 18 living with them, 45.4 percent were married couples living together, 13.2 percent had a female householder with no husband present, and 36.4 percent were non-families. 29.3 percent of all households were made up of individuals, and 11.3 percent had someone living alone who was 65 years of age or older. The average household size was 2.42 and the average family size was 3.00.

In the county, the population was spread out, with 26.5 percent under the age of 20. The median age was 38.6 years. For every 100 females there were 96.73 males.

2020 Census

Metropolitan Statistical Area

The United States Office of Management and Budget has designated Erie County as the Erie, PA Metropolitan Statistical Area (MSA).  As of the 2010 U.S. Census the metropolitan area ranked 11th most populous in the State of Pennsylvania and the 164th most populous in the United States with a population of 280,566.  Erie County is also a part of the larger Erie-Meadville, PA Combined Statistical Area (CSA), which combines the populations of Erie County as well as Crawford County to the south.  The Combined Statistical Area ranked seventh in the State of Pennsylvania and 102nd most populous in the United States with a population of 369,331.

Largest populations in Erie County

Government and politics
Prior to 1960, Erie County was primarily Republican in presidential elections, only backing Democratic Party candidates in four elections from 1888 to 1956. Since 1960, it has become primarily Democratic, with only four Republican wins in the county in presidential elections from 1960 to the present. Nevertheless, since the 2016 Presidential Election, the county has become increasingly competitive, with Donald Trump narrowly winning the county in 2016, and Joe Biden narrowly flipping the county in 2020.

|}

The county seat of government is in Erie. The county has a home-rule charter and is run by a county executive. The current County Executive is Brenton Davis. Davis assumed the office on January 3, 2022, following the retirement of County Executive Kathy Dahlkemper. The remaining elected officials of the executive branch are the Erie County Controller, Erie County Coroner, Erie County District Attorney, Erie County Sheriff, and Erie County Clerk. see latest list

Erie County Council
The legislature consists of a county council. The Erie County Council is made up of seven councilpersons elected to represent seven geographical districts. see map A chair and vice chair are chosen among the councilpersons to lead the council.

Terry Scutella, Democratic, District 1-Millcreek Township Districts 2 through 10, 12 through 17, and 22 through 25
Andre Horton, Democratic, Chairman, District 2-Erie 1st Ward Districts 1 through 8; Erie 2nd Ward Districts 1, 2, 3, 4, 6, 7 and 9; Erie 3rd Ward Districts 1, 3, 4 and 5; Erie 4th Ward Districts 1 through 9; and Lawrence Park Township Districts 1, 2, and 3
Mary Rennie, Democratic, District 3-Erie's 2nd Ward District 8; Erie's 3rd Ward Districts 2, 6 and 7; Erie's 5th Ward Districts 1, 2, 11 and 20; Erie's 6th Ward; and Millcreek Township Districts 11, 18, 19 and 20
Jim Winarski, Democratic, District 4-Erie's 2nd Ward District 5; Erie's 5th Ward Districts 3 through 10, 12 through 19, and 21; Wesleyville Borough District 2 (West District); and Millcreek Township Districts 1 and 21
Brian Shank, Republican, District 5-North East Borough 1st and 2nd Wards; Wesleyville Borough District 1 (East District); and Greene, Harborcreek, North East and Summit townships.
Sam "Charlie" Bayle, Republican, District 6-City of Corry; the boroughs of Edinboro, Elgin, Union City, Waterford and Wattsburg; and Amity, Concord, Greenfield, LeBoeuf, Union, Venango, Washington, Waterford and Wayne townships
Ellen Schauerman, Republican, District 7-Boroughs of Albion, Cranesville, Girard, Lake City, McKean and Platea, as well as Conneaut, Elk Creek, Fairview, Franklin, Girard, McKean and Springfield townships

Judiciary
The judiciary is made up of nine judges serving the Erie County Court of Common Pleas and fifteen magisterial district judges serve the district courts. Court administration is managed by a district court administrator, deputy court administrator, and assistant court administrator. The Erie County Courthouse is located near Perry Square in downtown Erie. Erie County also operates a County Prison, and a combined 911/Emergency Management Agency under the Erie County Department of Public Safety, which is located in Summit Township.

Row officers
Clerk of Records, Kenneth Gamble, Democratic (Was appointed after the retirement of Pat Fetzner in 2015)
Controller, Dr. Kyle W. Foust, Democrat
Coroner, Lyell Cook, Republican
District Attorney, Jack Daneri, Republican
Sheriff, John Loomis, Democratic

Politics
As of November 7, 2022, there are 178,785 registered voters in Erie County.

 Democratic: 84,405 (47.21%)
 Republican: 68,483 (38.30%)
 Independent: 18,004 (10.07%)
 Third Party:: 7,893 (4.41%)

Unlike most of northwestern Pennsylvania, Erie County tends to lean Democratic in statewide and national elections. All four statewide winners carried the county in 2008. The margins of victory for the Democratic presidential candidate in the 2000, 2004, and 2008 elections in Erie County were 9, 8, and 20 percentage points, respectively.

The county is considered a bellwether polity.

State Senate
 Dan Laughlin (R), Pennsylvania's 49th Senatorial District
 Michele Brooks (R), Pennsylvania's 50th Senatorial District

State House of Representatives
 Patrick J. Harkins (D), Pennsylvania's 1st Representative District
 Robert Merski (D), Pennsylvania's 2nd Representative District
Ryan A. Bizzarro (D), Pennsylvania's 3rd Representative District
 Jake Banta (R), Pennsylvania's 4th Representative District
 Brad Roae (R), Pennsylvania's 6th Representative District
 Parke Wentling (R), Pennsylvania's 17th Representative District

United States House of Representatives
 Mike Kelly (R), Pennsylvania's 16th congressional district

United States Senate
 John Fetterman, Democrat
 Bob Casey, Democrat

Education

Public school districts

 Corry Area School District
 Erie City School District
 Fairview School District
 Fort LeBoeuf School District
 General McLane School District
 Girard School District
 Harbor Creek School District
 Iroquois School District
 Millcreek Township School District
 North East School District
 Northwestern School District
 Union City Area School District
 Wattsburg Area School District

Approved private schools

 Barber National Institute, Erie, Pennsylvania

Community College
After years of advocacy on the issue, Erie County Council approved sponsorship of an Erie County Community College on June 28, 2017. Council Chairman Jay Breneman and colleagues Andre Horton, Kathy Fatica and Fiore Leone voted in favor of sponsoring the community college, which was later signed by County Executive Kathy Dahlkemper. The County Executive's administration took the lead in presenting the proposal to the Pennsylvania State Board of Education for approval, supported by a cross-section of business, civic, labor, and community leaders.

Recreation
There are two Pennsylvania state parks in Erie County and both are on the shores of Lake Erie.

 Erie Bluffs State Park – one of Pennsylvania's newest state parks
 Presque Isle State Park – one of Pennsylvania's oldest state parks and the most-visited state park in Pennsylvania.

Recreation
 Splash Lagoon Indoor Waterpark
 Millcreek Mall
 Presque Isle Downs and Casino
 Presque Isle State Park
 Erie Zoo
 Tom Ridge Environmental Center
 Erie Maritime Museum
 Warner Theatre
 Erie Art Museum
 Waldameer Park
 Erie County Public Library

Annual events
 Roar on the Shore

Libraries
The foremost public library in Erie is part of the Erie County library system, which consists of five branches and a bookmobile. The Raymond M. Blasco, M. D. Memorial Library, named for its benefactor, opened in 1996. Now called the Main Library or the Erie County Public Library, is the third-largest library in Pennsylvania. It is connected to the Erie Maritime Museum, both of which are part of a bayfront improvement project that includes the Bayfront Convention Center and the Bicentennial Tower on Dobbins Landing. The Main Library is praised for its waterfront views of the Presque Isle Bay, where the historic U.S. Brig Niagara is often located. The library was moved to this location approximately 25 years ago, from its previous home in the center of downtown Erie. The library's renovation directly contributed to the revitalization of the waterfront, which was previously underdeveloped.

The second floor of the Main Library is home to an art collection, containing historic pieces like Summer Afternoon, Isle of Shoals by Frederick Childe Hassam. The display also features several local artists. The library works with the International Institute of Erie (IIE) to offer tours of the library, a collection of foreign-language books, and other practical information about immigration processes. The library also provides a heritage room where one can conduct genealogy research concerning their ancestors who resided in Erie County or Northwest Pennsylvania.

The four remaining libraries within the Erie County library system are the Edinboro Branch Library, Iroquois Avenue Branch Library, Lincoln Community Center Branch Library, and Millcreek Branch Library. The other public libraries of Erie County include the Albion Area Public Library, Corry Public Library, McCord Memorial Library, Rice Avenue Public Library, Union City Public Library, and Waterford Public Library.

Communities

Under Pennsylvania law, there are four types of incorporated municipalities: cities, boroughs, townships, and, in at most two cases, towns. There are 38 incorporated municipalities in Erie County, including 2 cities, 14 boroughs, and 22 townships. The following cities, boroughs and townships are located in Erie County:

Cities
 Corry
 Erie (county seat)

Boroughs

 Albion
 Cranesville
 Edinboro
 Elgin
 Girard
 Lake City
 McKean
 Mill Village
 North East
 Platea
 Union City
 Waterford
 Wattsburg
 Wesleyville

Townships

 Amity Township
 Concord Township
 Conneaut Township
 Elk Creek Township
 Fairview Township
 Franklin Township
 Girard Township
 Greene Township
 Greenfield Township
 Harborcreek Township
 Lawrence Park Township
 LeBoeuf Township
 McKean Township
 Millcreek Township
 North East Township
 Springfield Township
 Summit Township
 Union Township
 Venango Township
 Washington Township
 Waterford Township
 Wayne Township

Census-designated places
Census-designated places are geographical areas designated by the U.S. Census Bureau for the purposes of compiling demographic data. They are not actual jurisdictions under Pennsylvania law. Other unincorporated communities, such as villages, may be listed here as well.

 Avonia
 Fairview
 Lawrence Park
 Northwest Harborcreek
 Penn State Erie (Behrend)

Population ranking
The population ranking of the following table is based on the 2010 census of Erie County.

† county seat

See also
 National Register of Historic Places listings in Erie County, Pennsylvania

References

External links
 Erie County
 "History of Erie County, Pennsylvania" (1884)
 Erie County, PA Genealogy Page

 
1803 establishments in Pennsylvania
Populated places established in 1803
Counties of Appalachia
Populated places on the Underground Railroad